Alice Cooper Goes to Hell is the second solo album by American rock musician Alice Cooper, released in 1976. A continuation of Welcome to My Nightmare as it continues the story of Steven, the concept album was written by Cooper with guitar player Dick Wagner and producer Bob Ezrin.

With the success of "Only Women Bleed" from his first solo effort, Alice continued with the rock ballads on this album. “I Never Cry” was written about his drinking problem, which would in one year send the performer into rehab and affect all his subsequent music up to and including 1983’s DaDa. Cooper called the song "an alcoholic confession".

The "Alice Cooper Goes to Hell" tour of 1976 was completely cancelled prior to commencement due to Cooper suffering from anemia at the time. However, a number of songs from the album ended up in Cooper's live show. "Go to Hell" proved the last song until the 1989 hit song "Poison" to become a consistent part of Cooper's live setlists, being performed on most tours to the present. "I Never Cry" was also regularly performed in the late 1970s and during the 2000s, while "Guilty" was performed regularly on the Flush the Fashion and Special Forces tours and occasionally during the 2000s, and "Wish You Were Here" was frequently played on the tours for the following two albums.

Critical reception
Rolling Stone wrote that "the soppy old standard, 'I’m Always Chasing Rainbows', probably expresses [Cooper's] musical sympathies much better than this record’s dynamic, if derivative, rock & roll."

Track listing

Personnel
Alice Cooper – vocals
Dick Wagner – acoustic and electric guitar, vocals
Steve Hunter – guitar
John Tropea - guitar
Bob Ezrin – piano, Fender Rhodes, synthesizer, vocals
Tony Levin – bass
Allan Schwartzberg – drums
Jimmy Maelen - percussion
Additional personnel 
Bob Babbitt – bass on "Go to Hell"
Jim Gordon – drums on "I'm the Coolest", "I'm Always Chasing Rainbows" and "Going Home"
Dick Berg - French horn on "I Never Cry"
Bill Misener, Colina Phillips, Denny Vosburgh, Laurel Ward, Michael Sherman, Sharon Lee Williams, Shawne Jackson, Shep Gordon, Joe Gannon - vocals
Allan Macmillan, Bob Ezrin, Dick Wagner, John Tropea, The Hollywood Vampires - arrangements
Technical
Brian Christian, Corky Stasiak, Jim Frank, John Jansen, Ringo Hrycyna - recording
Brian Hagiwara, Rod Dyer - design
Bret Lopez - photography

Charts

Weekly charts

Year-end charts

Certifications

"I Never Cry" Single :

Cover versions
“Go to Hell” was covered by Dee Snider, Zakk Wylde, Bob Kulick, Rudy Sarzo, Frankie Banali and Paul Taylor on the 1999 tribute album Humanary Stew: A Tribute to Alice Cooper. Also, was included on the 2009 videogame Grand Theft Auto IV: The Lost and Damned on the fictitious station Liberty Rock Radio.

References

Alice Cooper albums
1976 albums
Concept albums
Albums produced by Bob Ezrin
Warner Records albums
Sequel albums